"Summer Sixteen" is a single by Canadian rapper Drake, released to promote his fourth studio album Views, although it was not included on that album. The song premiered on OVO Sound Radio and was released for digital download on January 30, 2016. It was produced by 40, Boi-1da and Cubeatz. It features uncredited vocals by DJ Khaled.

Background
The song contains a slowed-down sample of the song "Glass Tubes" performed by Brian Bennett. The artwork for the single was designed by Filip Pągowski, the creator of the Comme des Garçons logo. The song has been interpreted as a diss track against American rapper Meek Mill.

Commercial performance 
"Summer Sixteen" debuted at number six on the US Billboard Hot 100 the week of February 20, 2016, selling 215,000 downloads in its first week; these sales became the highest debut sales of Drake's career. As of March 26, 2016, the single sold 358,032 copies in the United States.

Personnel 
Adapted from Jaxsta.

 40 – production, songwriting mixing, recording
 Boi-1da – production (uncredited), songwriting
 Cubeatz  – production (uncredited), songwriting
 Drake – songwriting, vocals
 DJ Khaled – vocals (uncredited)
 Noel Campell – mixing

Charts

Year-end charts

Certifications and sales

References

External links
Lyrics of this song at Genius

Drake (musician) songs
2016 songs
2016 singles
Songs written by Drake (musician)
Song recordings produced by Boi-1da
Song recordings produced by Cubeatz
Diss tracks
Song recordings produced by 40 (record producer)
Songs written by Boi-1da
Songs written by 40 (record producer)
Songs written by Tim Gomringer
Songs written by Kevin Gomringer